Brachytoma is a genus of sea snails, marine gastropod mollusks in the family Pseudomelatomidae.

R.N. Kilburn proposed in 1989 the name Brachytoma to be rejected, since the type species  Pleurotoma strombiformis G. B. Sowerby II, 1839 is considered a nomen dubium and there is no valid ground for conferring type status upon it.

Species
Species within the genus Brachytoma include:
 † Brachytoma annandalei Vredenburg, 1921
 †  Brachytoma buddhaica Vredenburg, 1921 
 † Brachytoma convexa Vredenburg, 1921 
 † Brachytoma gautama Vredenburg, 1921 
 † Brachytoma pinfoldi Vredenburg, 1921 
 † Brachytoma reticulata Vredenburg, 1921 
 Brachytoma rioensis (Smith E. A., 1915)
 Brachytoma rufolineata (Schepman, 1913)
 † Brachytoma sarasvati Vredenburg, 1921 
 † Brachytoma simazirianus Nomura & Zinbo, 1936
 † Brachytoma tjemoroensis Martin, 1903 
 Brachytoma tuberosa (Smith E. A., 1875)
 † Brachytoma yabei Vredenburg, 1921 
Species brought into synonymy
 Brachytoma crenularis Graveley, 1942: synonym of Ptychobela nodulosa (Gmelin, 1791) 
 Brachytoma investigatoris Smith, 1899: synonym of Drillia investigatoris (Smith, 1899)
 Brachytoma kawamurai Habe & Kosuge, 1966: synonym of Cheungbeia kawamurai (Habe & Kosuge, 1966) (original combination)
 Brachytoma kurodai Habe & Kosuge, 1966 : synonym of Inquisitor kurodai (Habe & Kosuge, 1966)
 †  Brachytoma sacra Reeve, 1845:synonym of †  Tylotiella sacra (Reeve, 1845) 
 Brachytoma sinensis (Hinds, 1843): synonym of Crassispira sinensis (Hinds, 1843)
 Brachytoma spuria (Hedley, 1922): synonym of Turricula nelliae spuria (Hedley, 1922)
 Brachytoma sumatrensis Powell, 1966: synonym of Ptychobela sumatrensis (Petit de la Saussaye, 1852) 
 Brachytoma takeokensis Otuka, 1949: synonym of Crassispira takeokensis (Otuka, 1949) (original combination)
 Brachytoma vexillum Habe & Kosuge, 1966 : synonym of Ptychobela vexillium (Habe & Kosuge, 1966) (original combination)
 Brachytoma zuiomaru Nomura & Hatai, 1940: synonym of Inquisitor jeffreysii (E. A. Smith, 1875): synonym of Funa jeffreysii (E. A. Smith, 1875)
Further investigation needed
 Brachytoma strombiformis (G.B. Sowerby II, 1839) (species inquirenda)

References

 E. Vredenburg. 1921. Comparative diagnoses of Pleurotomidae from the Tertiary formations of Burma. Records of the Geological Survey of India 53:83-129

External links
 
 Bouchet, P.; Kantor, Y. I.; Sysoev, A.; Puillandre, N. (2011). A new operational classification of the Conoidea (Gastropoda). Journal of Molluscan Studies. 77(3): 273-308

 
Pseudomelatomidae
Gastropod genera